Frank Frost was an American amateur soccer player who competed in the 1904 Summer Olympics. In 1904 he was a member of the St. Rose Parish team, which won the bronze medal in the soccer tournament.

References

External links

American soccer players
Footballers at the 1904 Summer Olympics
Olympic bronze medalists for the United States in soccer
Year of birth missing
Year of death missing
Association football goalkeepers
Medalists at the 1904 Summer Olympics